Ângelo Ferreira Carvalho  (3 August 1925 - 8 October 2008), was a Portuguese footballer who played for FC Porto, as defender.

International career
Carvalho gained 15 caps for the Portugal national team and made his debut 9 April 1950 in Lisbon, a 2-2 draw against Spain in the Qualification for the 1950 World Cup.

External links

1925 births
FC Porto players
Portugal international footballers
Portuguese footballers
Primeira Liga players
2008 deaths
Association football defenders